Girlfriend From Hell is a 1989 American comedy-horror film that was written and directed by Daniel M. Peterson. The film had its world premiere on April 24, 1989 at the Houston Film Festival and was released to video in August of the following year. It starred Dana Ashbrook and Liane Curtis, and follows a young high school girl who is possessed by the Devil in order to steal souls.

Plot
Maggie (Liane Curtis) is a shy high school girl that isn't very good with men. This changes after she's possessed by Satan, who uses Maggie's body to seduce the souls out of various men. Satan is followed by an angelic Chaser (Dana Ashbrook), who is intent on capturing her once and for all.

Cast and characters
 Dana Ashbrook as Chaser
 Liane Alexandra Curtis as Maggie
 Lezlie Deane as Diane
 Anthony Barrile as Carl
 James Daughton as Thomas J. Harper
 Sarah Kaite Coughlan as Freda 
 Gerry Lively as God
 Daphna Kastner as Nun with Gun
 Ken Abraham as Rocco
 Hilary Morse as Alice
 Brad Zutaut as Teddy
 Jack West as Hershel
 Renee Wayne Golden as Mother Superior
 Laura Bruneau as Sister Franks
 Kim North as Sister Beans
 Susan Rome as Nun with Gun
 Jaqueline Robinson as Nun with Gun
 James Karen as Carl's Dad
 Alba Francesca as Carl's Mom

Reception
Initial critical reception was poor and Allmovie rated it at two stars.

Screened as part of their 25th Anniversary Project, Paul Freitag-Fey of Daily Grindhouse wrote it was "the type of film that sets up a mythology for the sake of a few jokes and then doesn't give a shit about it". IE: "The gun-toting nuns have nothing to do with the plot, mind you, and they have no idea they’re shooting at Satan – the filmmakers just wanted to make a joke about gun-toting nuns." They felt the viewer would do well to not concentrate on the plot, as the film was intended to be gag-based "goofy, light-hearted exploitation comedy" that did not take itself seriously.

In Creature Features: The Science Fiction, Fantasy, and Horror Movie Guide, author John Stanley praised the film, writing that it was "a supernatural/sci-fi spoof so dumb that it's fun to watch thanks to good performances by an appealing cast."

Stage musical
In 2011 playwright/composer Sean Matthew Whiteford adapted Girlfriend from Hell into a stage musical. The transformative musical features 20 songs and a much revamped storyline. It premiered at the Gene Frankel Theatre in the East Village in 2011. In April 2015, a concert version of the musical was presented at 54 Below, Broadway's Supper Club in NYC, following an evening of Patti LuPone. On August 1, 2015, another concert version was presented at The Cutting Room in NYC. A studio cast recording was made in Winter 2016 featuring Justin Matthew Sargent, Josephine Rose Roberts & Neka Zang. In 2019, Deb Miller of DC Metro Theatre Arts raved that “Whiteford’s hilarious high school horror show has the makings of a rock musical cult classic.” A website for the musical, girlfriendfromhellmusical.com was launched in 2020.

References

External links
 
 
 

1989 films
1989 horror films
1980s comedy horror films
American comedy horror films
American independent films
1989 comedy films
1980s English-language films
1980s American films